Marcy Village Apartments is a historic community located in Indianapolis, Indiana, United States. Ground for the development was broken the week of March 20, 1939, and work was started on a full-time basis with Everett A. Carson of Indianapolis as the builder. Architects, Granger & Bollenbacher of Chicago, created the Colonial Revival apartment community for owners at the time, Marcy Realty Corporation.

History
On October 10, 1938, a project hearing was held before the Board of Zoning Appeals on a petition for variance to permit construction to start within two weeks on the $1,680,000 multi-apartment project to be located in northeast Indianapolis. Samuel B. Sutphin of New Augusta, owner of the 25-acre site for the proposed project, filed the petition with the zoning board.

Purchase of the site by the Marcy Realty Corporation depended upon favorable action by the zoning board. The multi apartment project first was planned by its sponsors on a tract at 59th street and the Monon Railroad but was abandoned when nearby property owners protested. The new site was bounded on the north by 46th street between College and Keystone Ave in Indianapolis, just north of the Indiana State School for the Deaf. Development of the project took 500 workmen nearly eight months to construct.

The Marcy Village large-scale housing project was the first Federal Housing Administration project of its type completed in Indiana. The buildings are distributed over the twenty-five-acre tract.

Marcy Village, which represents an expenditure of approximately $1,690,000, was an implemented under section 207of the National Housing Act of 1934. Under that section, sponsors may borrow from some private lending institution approved by the government any amount up to $5,000,000, at an interest rate not to exceed 4%, for terms to be approved by the administer and which in some instances run as long as thirty three years, for the construction of apartment buildings or groups of single-family buildings. At the time, Marcy Village was the 90th project completed in Indiana under that plan, though Marcy Village was the largest of its type in Indiana.

Colonial architecture is the primary design of the nineteen buildings of the project. Additionally to the apartments, there were shops consisting of five storerooms, which were occupied by a drug store, grocery, barber shop, beauty shop, and dentists' and doctors offices.

General contractor
General contractor for the project was Everett A. Carson, Indianapolis-based general contractor, and father of Dr. Wayne Carson, surgeon and sponsor. E. A. Carson built structures in and near Indianapolis, including the front for SS. Peter and Paul Cathedral on North Meridian Street, St. Joan of Arc Catholic Church and parochial school building, and several academic buildings for Indiana University.

References

Historic districts on the National Register of Historic Places in Indiana
Residential buildings on the National Register of Historic Places in Indiana
Colonial Revival architecture in Indiana
1939 establishments in Indiana
Residential buildings completed in 1939
Residential buildings in Indianapolis
Historic districts in Indianapolis
National Register of Historic Places in Indianapolis